Johannes Thomas (born 11 September 1949) is a German rower who competed for East Germany in the 1976 Summer Olympics.

He was born in Dresden. In 1976 he was the coxswain of the East German boat which won the silver medal in the coxed four event.

References

1949 births
Living people
Rowers from Dresden
East German male rowers
Coxswains (rowing)
Olympic rowers of East Germany
Rowers at the 1976 Summer Olympics
Olympic silver medalists for East Germany
Olympic medalists in rowing
Medalists at the 1976 Summer Olympics